Karantaba is an arrondissement of Goudomp in Sédhiou Region in Senegal.

References 

Arrondissements of Senegal